The Chairman's Stakes is a Melbourne Racing Club Group 3 Thoroughbred horse race, raced under set weights with penalties conditions for two-year-olds, over a distance of 1000 metres run at Caulfield Racecourse in Melbourne, Australia in February. Prize money for the race is A$200,000.

History
Originally this race was named after Bounding Away, Australian Horse Of The Year 1985–1986, who won the 1986 Blue Diamond Stakes – Golden Slipper Stakes double.
One thoroughbred has captured the Chairman's Stakes – Golden Slipper Stakes double: Crystal Lily (2010)
Three thoroughbreds have captured the Chairman's Stakes – Blue Diamond Stakes double: Redoute's Choice (1999), Road To Success (2000), Extreme Choice (2016)

Name
1990–1998 - Bounding Away Quality
1999–2003 - Veuve Clicquot Stakes
2004 - Jansz Stakes
2005–2007 - Pol Rogers Stakes
2008 - National Jockey Celebration Classic
2009 - Pol Rogers Stakes
2010–2011 - Chairman's Stakes
2012 - Emirate Airline Stakes
2013 onwards - Chairman's Stakes

Grade
1990–2013 - Listed race
2014 onwards  - Group 3

Distance
1990–1996 – 1000 metres
1997–2002 – 1100 metres
 2003–2007 – 1200 metres
2008 – 1000 metres
2009–2010 – 1100 metres
2011 – 1000 metres
2012–2014 – 1100 metres
 2015 – 1000 metres
2016 – 1100 metres
2017 onwards - 1000 metres

Venue
 1990–1993 - Caulfield Racecourse
 1994 - Sandown Racecourse
 1995 - Caulfield Racecourse
 1996 - Sandown Racecourse
 1997–2010 -  Caulfield Racecourse
 2011 - Sandown Racecourse
 2012–2014 -  Caulfield Racecourse
 2015 - Sandown Racecourse
 2016 onwards - Caulfield Racecourse

Winners

2023 - Zulfiqar
2022 - Sebonack
2021 - Enthaar
2020 - Mildred
2019 - Loving Gaby
2018 - Eniss Hill
2017 - Formality
2016 - Extreme Choice  
2015 - Thurlow  
2014 - Nayeli          
2013 - Metastasio        
2012 - Mama's Choice     
2011 - Atomic            
2010 - Crystal Lily      
2009 - Headway           
2008 - Whisper Bay       
2007 - Gibraltar Campion 
2006 - Ulfah             
2005 - Under The Floor   
2004 - Tirade                   
2003 - Vengeance Of Rain       
2002 - Yell               
2001 - Spitz              
2000 - Road To Success       
1999 - Redoute's Choice    
1998 - Coup De Grace        
1997 - Bonegilla Tom      
1996 - Balcanny           
1995 - Tennessee Magic     
1994 - Fluoro             
1993 - Lady In Reality   
1992 - Tennessee Mist     
1991 - Pampas Fire        
1990 - Wrap Around

See also
 List of Australian Group races
 Group races

References

Horse races in Australia
Caulfield Racecourse
Flat horse races for two-year-olds